Dolphin's Nose  Viewpoint is a tourist spot in Coonoor, The Nilgiris District, Tamil Nadu.  Dolphin's Nose is well over 1,550 Meter (5075 Feet) above sea level, 10 km from Coonoor and is  a spectacular spot to visit.  The tip of the peak resembles a dolphin's nose, hence the name Dolphin's Nose. It is an enormous rock formation that is entirely unique. There are gigantic ravines found both to the left and right of Dolphin's Nose and there is a view of inspiring Catherine Falls with its continuing stream several thousand metres below which is located a relatively short distance away opposite of the Dolphin's Nose. Best part of spot are the hairpin turns and tea plantations on the way

Tourist spots

The following are the tourist spot in Coonoor:
 Lamb's Rock
 Sim's Park
 Droog Fort
 Law's Falls
 Katary Falls
 Lady Canning Seat

Location
Dolphin's Nose is situated at 12 km away from Coonoor.  If you start driving from Coonoor to Kotagiri you can see a road taking to your right with a board saying Dolphin's Nose 11 km.

See also
 Coonoor
 Nilgiri mountains
 Catherine Falls
 List of noses

References

External links

 
 
 

Tourist attractions in Nilgiris district
Coonoor